Mat District was one of the 36 districts of Albania, which were dissolved in July 2000 and replaced by 12 newly created counties. It was named after the river Mat, which flows through the district. Its capital was the town of Burrel. Its territory is now part of Dibër County: the municipalities of Mat and Klos.

Administrative divisions
The district consisted of the following municipalities:

Baz
Burrel
Derjan
Gurrë
Klos
Komsi
Lis
Macukull
Rukaj
Suç
Ulëz
Xibër

History 
In ancient times here lived a illyrian tribe named Pirustae. They were famous for their bravery and they proved this in their wars against the Roman Empire together with the Kingdom of Dardania. Mat is believed to be one of the oldest Albanian settlements, probably as old as the 2nd-5th century AD, and historical linguistic studies together with archeological evidence proves that. Some of the oldest settlements in the river Mat include Rubigo(Rubik), Lassius(Laç), Stelush, Guri i Bardhë, etc. At the beginning of the 15th century the Lord of Matja was Gjon Kastrioti, father of Skanderbeg. When Skanderbeg began his rebellion against Ottomans he also became the lord of Mat and some other territories as well. A synod of Catholic archdiocese was held in Matja in 1462 by Pal Egnelli known for his baptismal formula.

Notable locals 
 Zog of Albania, King of the Albanians
 Tarhoncu Ahmed Pasha, Grand Vizier of the Ottoman Empire

Hereditary Governors

Gallery

References

Districts of Albania
Geography of Dibër County